Jon Paul Scott is an American Christian minister and academic administrator. He is principal of Nazarene Theological College of Central Africa in Lilongwe, Malawi, affiliated with the Church of the Nazarene. In 1969, he graduated from Olivet Nazarene University with a BS in Business Administration.

References

1940s births
Heads of universities and colleges in the United States
Living people
Year of birth missing (living people)